In the English language, a conspirator is a party to a conspiracy. In a criminal conspiracy, each alleged party is a "co-conspirator".

Conspirator(s) may refer to:

Books
The Conspirators (novel), 1843 French historical novel by Alexandre Dumas and Auguste Maquet
Conspirator (novel), 2009 American sci-fi novel set in C. J. Cherryh's Foreigner universe

Films
The Conspirators (1924 film), British silent drama directed by Sinclair Hill
The Conspirators (1944 film), American World War II spy drama directed by Jean Negulesco
Conspirator (1949 film), British-American espionage thriller directed by Victor Saville
Nell'anno del Signore (English title: The Conspirators), a 1969 Italian historical drama directed by Luigi Magni
The Conspirator, a 2010 American historical drama directed by Robert Redford
Conspirators (film), a 2013 Hong Kong crime thriller directed by Oxide Pang

Other
The Conspirators (band), a British northern indie / folk band

See also
Conspirateurs, a French board game
Conspiracy (disambiguation)